International bassoonist and bassoon teacherPeter Musson 
Born Auckland 21st May 1940
Died Brisbane 8th April 2022
was a principal Bassoonist in the Queensland Symphony Orchestra and Senior Lecturer in Bassoon at the Queensland Conservatorium and was a soloist and member of chamber music ensembles.

Background
Education: Auckland Grammar School and St Peter's College, AucklandSt Peter's College. Peter gained a reputation as a child prodigy on clarinet, studying with George Hopkins, later moving to bassoon. In 1956, he auditioned for a position with the NZBC orchestra under James Robertson, the resident conductor of the orchestra, (who had instituted a policy of regular auditioning and reauditioning). Musson was appointed and, at the age of 16, became the youngest ever member of the NZBC Symphony Orchestra

Professional career
Peter remained with the NZBC Symphony Orchestra for twelve years (June 1956-March 1967), becoming Principal Bassoonist and also a member of the New Zealand Wind Quintet. In 1967 he left New Zealand in order to broaden his musical experience and travelled widely. After a period as a free-lance player in London he was appointed to Principal Bassoon positions with in turn, the Ulster Orchestra in Belfast, the Durban Symphony Orchestra in South Africa, the Niederrhein Sinfoniker in Germany and the Queensland Symphony Orchestra in Brisbane. Peter also appeared as Guest Principal with such orchestras as London's Royal Philharmonic Orchestra, the Gurzenich Orchestra of Cologne, the Australian Chamber Orchestra, the Tasmanian Symphony Orchestra and the Sydney Symphony Orchestra. He has also performed widely as a soloist and as a member of chamber music ensembles.

Teaching
Peter also had a very successful teaching career with former students having held professional playing and teaching positions on four continents. He has been on staff at the Belfast School of Music, the Krefeld Musikschule and the Queensland Conservatorium where he was Senior Lecturer in Bassoon and Chamber Music until 2002.

Family 
Children: Donna, Paul, Guy, Svetlana, Vladimir

Discography
"From Fire by Fire" Queensland Wind Soloists 4MBS 1990
"William Hurlstone Chamber Music" Continuum 2001

Notes

1940 births
People from Auckland
People educated at St Peter's College, Auckland
Living people
New Zealand musicians
New Zealand classical bassoonists
Academic staff of Queensland Conservatorium Griffith University
New Zealand Symphony Orchestra people
New Zealand expatriates in the United Kingdom
New Zealand expatriates in South Africa
New Zealand expatriates in Germany
New Zealand expatriates in Australia